A. hesperidum may refer to:

Alicyclobacillus hesperidum, a Gram-positive bacterium
Amitus hesperidum, a species of wasp